Drosophila orientacea is a member of the testacea species group of Drosophila. Testacea species are specialist fruit flies that breed on the fruiting bodies of mushrooms. Drosophila orientacea is found in northern Japan on the island of Hokkaido. However, the European species Drosophila testacea and D. orientacea can produce viable hybrids, blurring the level of speciation between the two species. While viable hybrids are produced, extreme behavioural barriers likely prevent mating in the wild. While D. orientacea readily mates with Drosophila neotestacea, viable hybrids are never produced. This hybrid inviability (see Haldane's rule) may be due either to issues during copulation, or selfish X chromosomes and co-evolved suppressors.

See also 

 Drosophila testacea species group
 Meiotic drive
 Haldane's rule

References 

orientacea
Insects described in 1992